A list of comedy films released in the 1980s.

American films

1980s

1980

 Airplane!
 Any Which Way You Can
 The Blues Brothers
 Caddyshack
 Can't Stop the Music
 Cheech and Chong's Next Movie
 Fatso
 First Family
 Galaxina
 Gilda Live
 Hero at Large
 Hopscotch
 How to Beat the High Co$t of Living
 The Last Married Couple in America
 Little Darlings
 Loose Shoes
 Melvin and Howard
 Midnight Madness
 Oh, God! Book II
 Oh! Heavenly Dog
 Nine to Five
 The Nude Bomb
 Popeye
 Pray TV
 Private Benjamin
 The Private Eyes
 Seems Like Old Times
 Serial
 Smokey and the Bandit II
 Stardust Memories
 Stir Crazy
 The Stunt Man
 Sunday Lovers
 Used Cars
 Up the Academy
 Where the Buffalo Roam
 Wholly Moses!

1981

 All Night Long
 Arthur
 Bustin' Loose
 Buddy Buddy
 Cannonball Run
 Carbon Copy
 Caveman
 Continental Divide
 The Devil and Max Devlin
 Dirty Tricks
 Going Ape!
 Hardly Working
 Heartbeeps
 History of the World, Part I
 The Incredible Shrinking Woman
 The Looney Looney Looney Bugs Bunny Movie
 Modern Problems
 Modern Romance
 Neighbors
 Nice Dreams
 Paternity
 Polyester
 Porky's
 Private Lessons
 Shock Treatment
 Stripes
 Take This Job and Shove It
 They All Laughed
 The Great Muppet Caper
 Under the Rainbow

1982

 48 Hours
 Airplane II: The Sequel
 Author! Author!
 Creepshow
 Best Friends
 Bugs Bunny's 3rd Movie: 1001 Rabbit Tales
 Dead Men Don't Wear Plaid
 Diner
 Eating Raoul
 Fast Times at Ridgemont High
 Grease 2
 Hanky Panky
 Human Highway
 It Came From Hollywood
 Jekyll and Hyde... Together Again
 Jinxed!
 Lookin' to Get Out
 My Favorite Year
 National Lampoon's Movie Madness
 Neil Simon's I Ought to Be in Pictures
 Night Shift
 Pandemonium
 Partners
 Richard Pryor: Live on the Sunset Strip
 Six Pack
 Some Kind of Hero
 Soup for One
 Slapstick of Another Kind
 Tempest
 They Call Me Bruce?
 Things Are Tough All Over
 Tootsie
 The Toy
 Trail of the Pink Panther
 Victor Victoria
 The World According to Garp
 Yes, Giorgio
 Young Doctors in Love
 Zapped!

1983

 A Christmas Story
 Baby It's You
 Better Late Than Never
 Bill Cosby: Himself
 Can She Bake a Cherry Pie?
 Class
 Cracking Up
 Curse of the Pink Panther
 Daffy Duck's Fantastic Island
 D.C. Cab
 Deal of the Century
 Doctor Detroit
 Easy Money
 Get Crazy
 Going Berserk
 The King of Comedy
 Losin' It
 Lovesick
 Max Dugan Returns
 Mr. Mom
 National Lampoon's Vacation
 Porky's II: The Next Day
 Private School
 Reuben, Reuben
 Risky Business
 Richard Pryor: Here and Now
 Romantic Comedy
 Smokey and the Bandit Part 3
 Spring Break
 Still Smokin
 The Sting II
 Strange Brew
 Stroker Ace
 The Man Who Loved Women
 The Man With Two Brains                                                                                             
 The Survivors
 To Be or Not to Be
 Trading Places
 Trenchcoat
 Two of a Kind
 Valley Girl
 Yellowbeard
 Zelig

1984

 16 Candles
 All of Me
 Bachelor Party
 Best Defense
 Beverly Hills Cop
 Blame It on Rio
 Broadway Danny Rose
 Cannonball Run II
 Cheech & Chong's The Corsican Brothers
 City Heat
 Electric Dreams
 Finders Keepers
 The Flamingo Kid 
 Ghostbusters
 Grandview, U.S.A.
 Gremlins
 The Ice Pirates
 Irreconcilable Differences
 Johnny Dangerously
 Kidco
 The Lonely Guy
 Lovelines
 Meatballs Part II
 Micki + Maude
 Moscow on the Hudson
 No Small Affair
 Nothing Lasts Forever
 Oh, God! You Devil
 Police Academy
 Protocol
 Repo Man
 The Ratings Game
 Revenge of the Nerds
 Rhinestone
 Romancing the Stone
 Splash
 Surf II
 Teachers
 This Is Spinal Tap
 The Census Taker
 The Muppets Take Manhattan
 The Wild Life
 The Woman in Red
 Top Secret!
 Unfaithfully Yours
 Up the Creek

1985

 After Hours
 Back to the Future
 Better Off Dead
 The Breakfast Club
 Brewster's Millions
 Clue
 Cocoon
 Desperately Seeking Susan
 Fletch
 Fraternity Vacation
 Girls Just Want to Have Fun
 The Goonies
 Head Office
 Heaven Help Us
 The Heavenly Kid
 Into the Night
 The Jewel of the Nile
 Just One of the Guys
 The Last Dragon
 Lost in America
 Maxie
 Moving Violations
 Movers & Shakers
 Murphy's Romance
 My Science Project
 National Lampoon's European Vacation
 Once Bitten
 Pee Wee's Big Adventure
 Police Academy 2: Their First Assignment
 Porky's Revenge
 Private Resort
 Prizzi's Honor
 The Purple Rose of Cairo
 Real Genius
 Remo Williams: The Adventure Begins
 Secret Admirer
 Spies Like Us
 Summer Rental
 The Man with One Red Shoe
 The Sure Thing
 Teen Wolf
 Tomboy
 Volunteers
 Weird Science

1986

 Armed and Dangerous
 Back to School
 The Best of Times
 Big Trouble in Little China
 Big Trouble
 Brighton Beach Memoirs
 Broadcast News
 The Class of Nuke 'Em High
 Club Paradise
 Crocodile Dundee
 Down and Out in Beverly Hills
 Echo Park
 Ferris Bueller's Day Off
 A Fine Mess
 The Golden Child
 Gung Ho
 Hamburger: The Motion Picture
 Hannah and Her Sisters
 Haunted Honeymoon
 Heartburn
 Howard the Duck
 Jake Speed
 Jo Jo Dancer, Your Life Is Calling
 Jumpin' Jack Flash
 Last Resort
 Legal Eagles
 The Longshot
 Lucas
 Little Shop of Horrors
 Meatballs III: Summer Job
 Miracles
 Modern Girls
 The Money Pit
 My Chauffeur
 Night of the Creeps
 Nobody's Fool
 Nothing in Common
 Odd Jobs
 Off Beat
 One Crazy Summer
 One More Saturday Night
 Peggy Sue Got Married
 Playing for Keeps
 Police Academy 3: Back in Training
 Running Scared
 Ruthless People
 Shanghai Surprise
 Short Circuit
 Soul Man
 Stewardess School
 Stoogemania
 Sweet Liberty
 ¡Three Amigos!
 Tough Guys
 True Stories
 Wildcats
 Wise Guys
 Zeisters

1987

 Adventures in Babysitting
 The Allnighter
 Amazon Women on the Moon
 Baby Boom
 Back to the Beach
 * batteries not included
 Beverly Hills Cop II
 Blind Date
 Born in East L.A.
 Broadcast News
 Burglar
 Cherry 2000
 Critical Condition
 Cross My Heart 
 Disorderlies
 Dragnet
 Eddie Murphy Raw
 Ernest Goes to Camp
 Fatal Beauty
 From the Hip
 Going Bananas
 Good Morning, Vietnam                                                                                                         
 Harry and the Hendersons
 Hello Again                                                                                                      
 Hot Pursuit
 Hunk
 Innerspace
 In the Mood
 Ishtar
 Leonard Part 6
 Lethal Weapon
 Like Father Like Son
 Love at Stake
 Maid to Order
 Making Mr. Right
 Mannequin
 Million Dollar Mystery
 Moonstruck
 Morgan Stewart's Coming Home
 Munchies
 My Demon Lover
 Nadine
 Outrageous Fortune
 Overboard
 Planes, Trains & Automobiles
 Police Academy 4: Citizens on Patrol
 Pretty Smart
 Radio Days
 Raising Arizona
 Real Men
 Rent-A-Cop
 Revenge of the Nerds II: Nerds in Paradise
 Roxanne
 The Squeeze
 Spaceballs
 Stakeout
 Street Trash
 Summer School
 Surrender
 Teen Wolf Too
 The Garbage Pail Kids Movie
 The Pick-up Artist
 The Trouble with Spies
 They Still Call Me Bruce
 Three for the Road
 Three Men and a Baby
 Three O'Clock High
 Throw Momma from the Train
 The Secret of My Success
 The Underachievers
 The Witches of Eastwick
 Tin Men 
 Walk Like a Man
 Who's That Girl

1988

 18 Again!
 A Fish Called Wanda
 Arthur 2: On the Rocks
 Beetlejuice
 Big
 Big Business
 Big Top Pee-wee
 Biloxi Blues
 Bull Durham
 Caddyshack II
 Casual Sex?
 Coming to America
 Crash Course
 Crocodile Dundee II
 Daffy Duck's Quackbusters
 Dangerous Curves
 Dead Heat
 Dirty Rotten Scoundrels
 Drowning by Numbers
 Earth Girls Are Easy
 Elvira: Mistress of the Dark 
 Ernest Saves Christmas
 Feds
 Funny Farm
 Hairspray
 Heartbreak Hotel
 Heathers
 High Spirits
 Hot to Trot
 I'm Gonna Git You Sucka
 Johnny Be Good
 Killer Klowns from Outer Space
 License to Drive
 Married to the Mob
 Memories of Me
 Midnight Run
 The Moderns
 Moon over Parador                                                                                                                  
 Moving
 Mystic Pizza
 My Stepmother Is an Alien
 Pass the Ammo
 Plain Clothes
 Police Academy 5: Assignment Miami Beach
 Punchline
 Scrooged
 She's Having a Baby
 Short Circuit 2
 Some Girls
 Stars and Bars
 Sticky Fingers
 Switching Channels
 Tapeheads
 The Couch Trip
 The Great Outdoors
 The Naked Gun: From the Files of Police Squad!
 The Telephone
 Twins
 Vibes
 Vice Versa
 Who Framed Roger Rabbit
 Working Girl
 You Can't Hurry Love

1989

 Always
 Back to the Future Part II
 Beverly Hills Brats
 Bill and Ted's Excellent Adventure
 Bloodhounds of Broadway
 Breaking In
 The Burbs
 Cannibal Women in the Avocado Jungle of Death
 Chances Are
 Cookie
 Crimes and Misdemeanors
 Dad
 Disorganized Crime
 Dream a Little Dream
 The Dream Team
 Family Business
 Fletch Lives
 Ghostbusters II
 Going Overboard
 Harlem Nights
 Homer and Eddie
 Honey, I Shrunk the Kids
 How I Got into College
 Identity Crisis
 The January Man
 K-9
 Lethal Weapon 2
 Let It Ride
 Little Monsters
 Look Who's Talking
 Major League
 Meet The Feebles
 Miss Firecracker
 National Lampoon's Christmas Vacation
 New York Stories
 Out Cold
 Parenthood
 Pink Cadillac
 Police Academy 6: City Under Siege
 Roger & Me (documentary)
 Rude Awakening
 Scenes from the Class Struggle in Beverly Hills
 Second Sight
 See No Evil, Hear No Evil
 She-Devil
 She's Out of Control
 Shocker
 Skin Deep
 Speed Zone
 Staying Together
 Steel Magnolias
 Tango and Cash
 Teen Witch
 The Big Picture
 The Toxic Avenger Part II
 Three Fugitives
 Troop Beverly Hills
 True Love
 Turner & Hooch
 UHF
 Uncle Buck
 Vampire's Kiss
 The War of the Roses
 Weekend at Bernie's
 When Harry Met Sally...
 Who's Harry Crumb?

British films

 An American Werewolf in London (1981)
 Brazil (1985)
 Bullshot (1983)
 Clockwise (1986)
 Comfort and Joy (1984)
 Consuming Passions (1988)
 Educating Rita (1983)
 Erik the Viking (1989)
 A Fish Called Wanda (1988)
 George and Mildred (1980)
 Gregory's Girl (1980)
 High Hopes (1988)
 Invitation to the Wedding (1983)
 Jane and the Lost City (1988)
 Local Hero (1983)
 Loose Connections (1983)
 The Missionary (1983)
 Monty Python's The Meaning of Life (1983)
 Morons from Outer Space (1985)
 Personal Services (1987)
 A Private Function (1984)
 Privates on Parade (1982)
 Restless Natives (1985)
 Rising Damp (1980)
 Rita, Sue and Bob Too (1986)
 Shirley Valentine (1989)
 The Tall Guy (1989)
 Time Bandits (1981)
 Victor Victoria (1982)
 Water (1985)
 Wish You Were Here (1987)
 Withnail and I (1987)

Comedy-horror
1981
 An American Werewolf in London
 Full Moon High
 The Funhouse
 Motel Hell

1982
 Basket Case
 Big Meat Eater
 Hysterical

1983
 Bloodbath at the House of Death
 Frightmare

1984
 Bloodsuckers from Outer Space
 Gremlins
 The Toxic Avenger

1985
 Mr. Vampire
 Once Bitten
 Re-Animator
 The Return of the Living Dead

1986
 Blood Hook
 Class of Nuke 'Em High
 Critters
 Evil Laugh
 From Beyond
 Haunted Honeymoon
 House
 Little Shop of Horrors
 Monster in the Closet
 Night of the Creeps
 The Seventh Curse
 TerrorVision
 Vamp

1987
 Bad Taste
 A Chinese Ghost Story
 Deathrow Gameshow
 Evil Dead II
 House II: The Second Story
 I Was a Teenage Zombie
 The Monster Squad

1988
 Beetlejuice
 Curse of the Queerwolf
 Dead Heat
 Elvira: Mistress of the Dark
 High Spirits
 Hollywood Chainsaw Hookers
 Killer Klowns from Outer Space
 The Lair of the White Worm
 My Best Friend Is a Vampire
 Night of the Demons
 Return of the Living Dead Part II
 Waxwork

1989
 Cannibal Women in the Avocado Jungle of Death
 Chopper Chicks in Zombietown
 Cutting Class
 Dr.Caligari
 My Mom's a Werewolf
 Out of the Dark
 Over-sexed Rugsuckers from Mars
 The Toxic Avenger Part II
 The Toxic Avenger Part III: The Last Temptation of Toxie

Sci-fi comedy

 The Adventures of Buckaroo Banzai Across the 8th Dimension (1984)
 Airplane II: The Sequel
 Back to the Future (1985)
 * batteries not included (1987)
 Bill & Ted's Excellent Adventure (1989)
 Cherry 2000 (1987)
 The Creature Wasn't Nice, aka Naked Space (1983)
 Critters (1986)
 Critters 2: The Main Course (1988)
 Earth Girls Are Easy (1988)
 Galaxina (1980)
 Ghostbusters (1984)
 Ghostbusters II (1989)
 Honey, I Shrunk the Kids (1989)
 The Ice Pirates (1984)
 The Incredible Shrinking Woman (1981)
 Innerspace (1987)
 Jekyll and Hyde... Together Again (1982)
 Killer Klowns from Outer Space (1988)
 Making Mr. Right (1987)
 The Man with Two Brains (1983)
 Morons from Outer Space (1985)
 My Science Project (1985)
 Night of the Comet (1984)
 Real Genius (1985)
 Repo Man (1984)
 Seksmisja (Poland, 1984)
 Short Circuit (1986)
 Short Circuit 2 (1988)
 Slapstick of Another Kind (1982)
 Spaceballs (1987)
 Time Bandits (1981)
 Weird Science (1985)

Comedy-drama

 48 Hrs. (1982)
 About Last Night... (1986)
 Always (1989)
 Author! Author!
 Bagdad Café (1987)
 Born in Flames (1983)
 The Breakfast Club (1985)
 Cannery Row (1982)
 The Decline of the American Empire (Le Déclin de l'empire américain) (1986)
 Driving Miss Daisy (1989)
 Fast Times at Ridgemont High
 Grandview, U.S.A. (1984)
 Hannah and Her Sisters
 Heartburn
 Jo Jo Dancer, Your Life Is Calling
 The King of Comedy
 Lucas
 Melvin and Howard (1980)
 Ménage (1986)
 Mystic Pizza
 My 20th Century (1989)
 Nothing in Common (1986)
 Oh! Heavenly Dog
 Private Benjamin (1980)
 Prizzi's Honor (1985)
 Punchline (1988)
 Samson & Sally – Song of the Whales (1984)
 Some Kind of Hero
 Steel Magnolias
 Teachers (1984)
 Working Girl (1988)

Parody films

 Agent 000 and the Deadly Curves (1983)
 Airplane! (1980)
 Airplane II: The Sequel (1982)
 Amazon Women on the Moon (1987)
 Chucky and Willie Wanker's Chocolate Starfish (1984)
 Closet Cases of the Nerd Kind
 History of the World Part 1
 I'm Gonna Git You Sucka (1988)
 Johnny Dangerously 1984
 The Naked Gun: From the Files of Police Squad! (1988)
 Night of the Comet (1984)
 Spaceballs (1987)
 Top Secret! (1984)
 Traxx (1988)
 UHF (1989)
 Zapped! (1982)

References

Comedy
1980s